Lamond is both a surname and a given name. Notable people with the name include:

Surname:
 William Bradley Lamond (1857–1924), Scottish painter
 Hector Lamond (1865–1947), Australian politician
 Frederic Lamond (pianist) (1868–1948), Scottish classical pianist and composer
 Henry George Lamond (1885–1969), Australian farmer and writer
 Alfred Lamond (1886–1967), Australian politician
 Angus Lamond (1909–1965), American lacrosse player 
 Don Lamond (1920–2003), American jazz drummer
Bill Lamond (1920-1990), Australian politician
 James Lamond (1928–2007), British Labour politician
 Frederic Lamond (Wiccan) (born 1931), Wiccan elder and author
 Toni Lamond (born 1932), Australian cabaret singer, stage actor, dancer and comedian
 Mary Jane Lamond (born 1960), Canadian folk musician
 George Lamond (born 1967), American musician
Given name:
 Lamond Murray (born 1973), American professional basketball player
 Lamond (born 1997), American rapper

Origin:
A brief summary of the origin - The surname Lamond originated from Scotland, from the Clan Lamont. Over time many Lamont's changed their names to Lamond. The Lamont Castle is located in Dunoon in Western Scotland.

See also
 Lamond-Riggs, a residential neighborhood in Northeast Washington, D.C.